Ron Botran is a line of rums from Guatemala distilled by the Industrias Licoreras de Guatemala, the same distillery that produces the Zacapa line of rums.  The six Botran rums are Etiqueta Blanca, Añejo Oro, Añejo 8, Añejo 12, Solera 1893, and XL.  Ron Botran was first manufactured in Quetzaltenango, Guatemala.

History 
The Botran family is commonly known for sugarcane production in Guatemala, but in 1939 they decided to begin a journey by establishing Industria Licorera Quetzalteca. The five brothers agreed that the ultimate place to age rum in Guatemala was Quetzaltenango. Since that day they have been involved in all the details regarding their rum production. Although the nurturing process has evolved, it all began with the nurturing process called “Sistema Solera.” This process implies the integration of young and old rums, as they mellow for years in white oak barrels. 
They are the first family that produced Guatemalan rum, nowadays they continue producing one of the world's finest quality rums. Solera 1893 and Reserva high quality rums have won many worldwide awards for their intricacy, profundity and signature sweet flavor.

Types of Rums 
 Botran Solera 1893: An elegant and complex combination of rums between 5 and 18 years old. These rums have been through a process of selection, they have been selected because of their balance and shape. The maturing of these rums has intensified its smell, resulting in burly and elegant rum. 
 Ron Botran Reserva: A complex incorporation of rums aged between 5 and 14 years, created through a slow and hard working process of raising, were the Botran family has been putting a unique style with a long lasting end and some sweet unique flavors.  
 Ron Botran XL: A really light white rum, aged in white American wood during 2 years with a slight smell of wood, vanilla and fruits with smooth flavor.  
 Ron Botran Anejo 12: This famous rum is the product of the combination of rums between 5 and 12 years old. 
 Ron Botran Anejo 8: Created through a fusion of rums between 4 and 8 years old. 
 Ron Botran Anejo 5: Rum created with a coalition of rums between 3 and 5 years old.

Awards 
One of the premium rums, Botran Reserva, received a Gold Medal award at the Ministry of Rum 2010. This tasting competition took place in San Francisco on August 5–6. The medals were awarded based on the aroma, initial taste, body and finish of each rum.

References

External links

 Distillery official website

Guatemalan brands
Guatemalan cuisine
Rums